The Liberty Tree District is a historic district encompassing a collection of six mid-scale commercial buildings between the Downtown Crossing area and the Theater District of Boston, Massachusetts.  They are clustered around the corner of Washington and Essex Streets, on the edge of the area known in the 20th century has Boston's Combat Zone, or adult entertainment district.  The area is historically significant as the site in the 1760s of the Liberty Tree and the Liberty Tree Tavern, a focal point of colonial discontent against British rule.  This significance is reflected in a carved relief on the Liberty Tree Block, a brick commercial block built in 1850 at the corner of Washington and Essex. The building was designated as a Boston Landmark by the Boston Landmarks Commission in 1985.

The district features Greek Revival, Late Victorian, and Italianate architecture. The area was added to the National Register of Historic Places in 1980.

See also 
 National Register of Historic Places listings in northern Boston, Massachusetts

External links
City of Boston, Boston Landmarks CommissionLiberty Tree Building Study Report

References

Historic districts in Suffolk County, Massachusetts
Boston Theater District
National Register of Historic Places in Boston
Historic districts on the National Register of Historic Places in Massachusetts
Landmarks in Boston